VTV7 is a national education and children television channel owned by Vietnam Television. It is a product of a cooperation between VTV Network's Center for Educational Productions with the Ministry of Education and Training of Vietnam, and its partners EBS (Korea) and NHK (Japan). VTV7 began airing on a trial basis on November 20, 2015, and began regular programming on January 1, 2016. Its launching ceremony was broadcast on January 8, 2016.

The audience of VTV7 is mainly students. At the beginning of the broadcast, VTV7 is aimed at preschool and elementary children. The channel also has programs suitable for other audiences such as middle school students, high school students, adults, ethnic minorities, and people with disabilities.

Although VTV7 spends most of its time on educational programs, it also has entertainment programming and programs of humanitarian significance. It also has purchased the copyright from foreign partners.

VTV7, along with VTV8 and VTV9 (new version), were 3 television channels which were launched in 2016.

Programmes

References 

Television networks in Vietnam
Vietnam Television original programming
Vietnamese-language television
Vietnamese-language television networks
2016 establishments in Vietnam
Educational and instructional television channels